Betty Glassey is a former Papua New Guinea international lawn bowler.

Bowls career
She represented Papua New Guinea at the 1969 World Outdoor Bowls Championship which was the first women's championships. 

Four years later she won the pairs bronze medal with Gladys Doyle at the 1973 World Outdoor Bowls Championship.

References

Living people
Papua New Guinean female bowls players
Year of birth missing (living people)